Roman, Román, or Romans is a surname appeared in many countries. Notable people with the surname include:

 Adalberto Román (born 1987), Paraguayan football player 
 Aída Román (born 1988), Mexican archer
 Alexandru Roman (1826–1897), Romanian publisher and academic, one of the founding members of the Romanian Academy
 Alison Roman (born 1985), American food writer, chef and internet personality and author of various cookbooks
 Antonino Roman (1939-2014), Filipino politician
 Bernard Romans (1741–1784), Dutch-born American navigator, surveyor, cartographer, naturalist, engineer, soldier, promoter, and writer
 Brian P. Roman, American astronomer
 Christine Romans, the Chief Business Correspondent on CNN
 Dale Romans (born 1966), American Thoroughbred racehorse trainer
 Francisco S. Román (1930–2016), Filipino scout
 Freddie Roman (1937-2022), American comedian
 Geraldine Roman (born 1967), Filipina journalist and politician
 Herminia Roman (born 1940), Filipina politician
 Johan Helmich Roman (1694–1758), Swedish composer
 Letícia Román (born 1941), Italian film actress
 Michael A. Roman, director of Election Day Operations for 2020 Trump campaign	
 Michael F. Roman (born 1959/60), CEO of 3M
 Miguel Román (born 1985), Mexican super featherweight boxer
 Mihai Roman (born 1984), Romanian football player 
 Mihai Roman (born 1992), Romanian football player
 Nancy Roman (1925–2018), American astronomer
 Nick Roman (1947–2003), American football player
 Paco Román (1869–1899), Filipino-Spanish soldier and revolutionary
 Petre Roman (born 1946), Romanian politician and Prime Minister of Romania
 Phil Roman (born 1930), American animator
 Raúl Román (born 1977), Paraguayan football player 
 Ric Roman (1916–2000), American actor 
 Ruth Roman (1922–1999), American actress
 Stephen Boleslav Roman (1921–1988), Slovakian-born Canadian mining engineer and mining executive
 Susan Roman (born 1957), Canadian voice actress
 Tony Roman (1936–1992), Czechoslovakian-born Canadian politician
 Valter Roman (1913–1983), Romanian communist activist and soldier

See also
 George Romanes (1848-1894), Canadian-born English evolutionary biologist and physiologist